This is a round-up of the 1984 Sligo Intermediate Football Championship. Geevagh were crowned champions in Centenary Year, after a comprehensive defeat of neighbours Shamrock Gaels, in the most one-sided final to date.

Quarter finals

Semi-finals

Sligo Intermediate Football Championship Final

Sligo Intermediate Football Championship
Sligo Intermediate Football Championship